Shek Pik San Tsuen or Shek Pik New Village aka. Shek Pik Resettlement is an urban village in Tsuen Wan District, Hong Kong.

History
The villages of Shek Pik Valley - Shek Pik, Fan Pui, Kong Pui and the hamlet of Hang Tsai - were demolished and cleared to allow construction of the Shek Pik Reservoir. A total of about 260 people were resettled as a consequence. Most of the villagers of Shek Pik Village moved into five-story apartment blocks in the urban Shek Pik New Village in Tsuen Wan. Most of the villagers of Fan Pui moved to a new village nearby, Tai Long Wan Tsuen at Tai Long Wan, Shek Pik. Some families from both villages moved to a row of houses near Mui Wo Ferry Pier.

Administration
Shek Pik San Tsuen is a recognized village under the New Territories Small House Policy.

References

External links

 Delineation of area of existing village Shek Pik San Tsuen (Tsuen Wan) for election of resident representative (2019 to 2022)

Villages in Tsuen Wan District, Hong Kong